Underboss is a position within the leadership structure of certain organized crime groups, particularly in Sicilian, Greek, and Italian-American Mafia crime families. The underboss is second in command to the boss. The underboss is sometimes a family member, such as a son, who will take over the family if the boss is sick, killed, or imprisoned. However the position of street boss has somewhat challenged the rank of underboss in the modern era. The position was installed within the Genovese crime family since at least the mid-1960s. It has also been used in the Detroit crime family and the Chicago Outfit.

The power of an underboss greatly varies; some are marginal figures, while others are the most powerful individual in the family. Traditionally they run day-to-day affairs of the family. In some crime families, the appointment is for life. If a new boss takes over a family with an existing underboss, that boss may marginalize or even murder the underboss appointed by his predecessor. On the other hand, if a boss is incarcerated, the underboss may become acting boss. As bosses often serve large periods of time in prison, an acting boss will often become the crime family's effective boss.  Even with the boss free, sometimes the underboss will gain enough power to become the effective head of the organization, and the boss will become a figurehead. An underboss likely has incriminating information about the boss, and so bosses often appoint people close to them to the underboss position for protection.

In most families, the underboss arbitrates many of the disputes. Depending on the seriousness of the problem, he might consult with the boss. Some conflicts are immediately bucked up to the boss. In those cases, the underboss usually sits in and offers his opinion. In either event, the ultimate authority rests with the boss. This sometimes chafes the ego of an ambitious underboss and can lead to problems.

An underboss receives monetary compensation in various ways. For example, he may be a partner in several rackets and thus get a cut. In addition, several capos may pass their envelopes through the underboss, who takes a percentage and passes the remainder to the boss. However he makes his illegal earnings, it is a significant enough amount to make his position one of envy, especially when prestige and the possibility of additional advancement are weighed. Sometimes an underboss will have his own crew.

Just like the boss of a family, an underboss may also have a right-hand man. This right-hand man may speak in place of an underboss or carry out additional tasks for the underboss.

Notable underbosses 

 Aniello Dellacroce (Gambino crime family)
 Salvatore Gravano (Gambino crime family)
 Venero Mangano (Genovese crime family)
 Frank DeCicco (Gambino crime family)
 Anthony Casso (Lucchese crime family)
 Salvatore Vitale (Bonanno crime family)
 Vincenzo Terranova (Morello crime family, currently known as Genovese crime family)
 Anthony Zizzo (Chicago Outfit)
 John DeRoss (Colombo crime family)
 Steven Crea (Lucchese crime family)
 John Cerone (Chicago Outfit)
 Sonny Franzese (Colombo crime family)
 Benedetto Aloi (Colombo crime family)
 Gennaro Langella (Colombo crime family)
 Tommy Lucchese (Lucchese crime family)
 Chuckie Merlino (Philadelphia crime family)

See also
 Consigliere

References
Maas, Peter, Underboss: Sammy the Bull Gravano's Story of Life in the Mafia. NY: HarperCollins, 1997. 
Capeci, Jerry. The Complete Idiot's Guide to the Mafia. Indianapolis: Alpha Books, 2002. 

Organized crime members by role
American Mafia
Sicilian Mafia